Johannes Adriaan Tromp (born 23 December 1990) is a Namibian rugby union player, who plays with Strela from Kazan in domestic rugby in Russia. . He was named in Namibia's squad for the 2015 Rugby World Cup. He plays as a scrum-half or fullback.

References

External links
 

1990 births
Living people
Eastern Province Elephants players
Namibia international rugby union players
Namibian Afrikaner people
Namibian rugby union players
Rugby union centres
Rugby union fullbacks
Rugby union players from Windhoek
Southern Kings players
Welwitschias players
White Namibian people